Glycacaridae is a family of mites belonging to the order Sarcoptiformes.

Genera:
 Glycacarus Griffiths, 1977

References

Sarcoptiformes